is a Japanese football player who currently plays as a defender for Kamatamare Sanuki.

Career statistics

Club
Last update: 2 December 2018

1 includes J. League Championship and Japanese Super Cup appearances.

Reserves performance

Honors

Gamba Osaka

J. League Division 1 - 2014
J. League Division 2 - 2013
Emperor's Cup - 2014, 2015
J. League Cup - 2014

References

External links

1993 births
Living people
Association football people from Osaka Prefecture
People from Ibaraki, Osaka
Japanese footballers
J1 League players
J2 League players
J3 League players
Gamba Osaka players
Gamba Osaka U-23 players
J.League U-22 Selection players
JEF United Chiba players
Kamatamare Sanuki players
Footballers at the 2014 Asian Games
Association football defenders
Asian Games competitors for Japan